Nationality words link to articles with information on the nation's poetry or literature (for instance, Irish or France).

Events
November 22 – English poet John Donne is installed as Dean of St Paul's Cathedral in London.

Works published

Great Britain
 John Ashmore, translator, Certain Selected Odes of Horace, Englished; and their Arguments Annexed
 Richard Brathwaite:
 Natures Embassie; or, The Wilde-Mans Measures
 Times Curtaine Drawne; or, The Anatomie of Vanitie
 Ralph Crane, The Workes of Mercy, Both Corporeal and Spiritual
 Francis Quarles, Hadassa; or, The History of Queene Ester
 George Sandys, The First Five Books of Ovid's Metamorphosis, published anonymously (see also Ovid's Metamorphosis 1626)
 Rachel Speght, Mortalities Memorandum: With a dreame prefixed, imaginarie in manner, reall in matter
 John Taylor:
 The Praise, Antiquity, and Commodity, of Beggery, Beggers and Begging
 Superbiae Flagellum; or, The Whip of Pride
 George Wither, The Songs of the Old Testament, verses and music
 Lady Mary Wroth (Sir Philip Sidney's niece), Pamphilia to Amphilanthus, sonnet sequence written since 1613 partially included in The Countess of Montgomery's Urania

Other
 Théophile de Viau, Œuvres poétiques, France

Births
Death years link to the corresponding "[year] in poetry" article:
 March 31 – Andrew Marvell (died 1678), English metaphysical poet and parliamentarian
 April 17 – Henry Vaughan (died 1695), Welsh poet
 July 8 – Jean de La Fontaine (died 1695), French poet and fable writer
 July 24 – Jan Andrzej Morsztyn (died 1693), Polish poet and member of the noble class Szlachta
 Rupa Bhavani (died 1721), Indian, Kashmiri-language poet
 Jane Cavendish (died 1669), English poet and playwright
 Wacław Potocki (died 1696), Polish nobleman (Szlachta), moralist, poet and writer

Deaths
Birth years link to the corresponding "[year] in poetry" article:
 March 28 – Ottavio Rinuccini (born 1562), Italian poet, courtier, and opera librettist
 August 3 – Guillaume du Vair (born 1556), French writer and poet
 August 15 – John Barclay (born 1582), Scottish satirist and poet
 September 25 – Mary Herbert (born 1561), English poet, translator, patron, hostess of a literary salon, and sister of Philip Sidney
 October 12 – Pierre Matthieu (born 1563), French playwright, poet and historian

See also

 Poetry
 16th century in poetry
 16th century in literature

Notes

17th-century poetry
Poetry